The 2007–08 season saw Amiens SC's compete in Ligue 2 where they finished in 14th position with 45 points.

Results

Legend

Ligue 2

Coupe de France

Coupe de la Ligue

Final league table

Squad statistics

References
 Player, results and statistics sourced from  ligue1.com

External links

Amiens SC seasons
Amiens